Lençóis Maranhenses National Park (Parque Nacional dos Lençóis Maranhenses) is a national park in Maranhão state in northeastern Brazil, just east of the Baía de São José. Protected on June 2, 1981, the  park includes  of coastline, and an interior composed of rolling sand dunes. During the rainy season, the valleys among the dunes fill with freshwater lagoons, prevented from draining due to the impermeable rock beneath. The park is home to a range of species, including four listed as endangered, and has become a popular destination for ecotourists.

Physical geography 
Inland, it is bordered by the Parnaíba River, the São José Basin, and the rivers of Itapecuru, Munim, and Periá.

About 70% of this rainfall occurs between the months of January and May.

The water in the lagoons is prevented from draining by a layer of impermeable rock located beneath the sandy surface.

Ecology
The lagoons in the park are often interconnected with one another, as well as with the rivers that run through the area. They are home to a number of fish and insect species, including the wolf fish, which burrows down into wet layers of mud and remains dormant during the dry season. Besides the dunes that form the centerpiece of the park, the ecosystem also includes area of restinga and mangrove ecosystems.

The park is home to four species listed on the Brazilian List of Endangered Species, the scarlet ibis (Eudocimus ruber), the neotropical otter (Lontra longicaudis), the oncilla (Leopardus tigrinus) and the West Indian manatee (Trichechus manatus). The park also includes 133 species of plants, 112 species of birds, and at least 42 species of reptiles.

Tourism 

Lençóis Maranhenses National Park receives as many as 60,000 visitors a year. Common activities within the park include surfing, canoeing and horseback riding.

In popular culture

The park was featured in the Brazilian film The House of Sand. Kadhal Anukkal, a song from an Indian Tamil language film Enthiran starring Rajnikanth and Aishwarya Rai Bachchan was also shot here. The films Avengers: Infinity War (2018) and Avengers: Endgame (2019) used the park's landscape as the planet of Vormir. A concert performed by the music group RY X was filmed by the YouTube channel Cercle in 2022

See also

Genipabu
Conservation in Brazil
List of national parks of Brazil

Notes

References

External links

 Lençóis Maranhenses National Park's Official site

National parks of Brazil
Protected areas of Maranhão
Protected areas established in 1981